Chris Veselka (born June 15, 1970) was an American soccer forward who played professionally in the United States and Germany.  He was the 1994 USISL leading scorer with 30 goals in 13 games.

Veselka spent one season, 1990, playing soccer at Florida International University.
In the summer of 1989, he played for the Austin Sockadillos in the Southwest Independent Soccer League.  Her returned for the 1990 season, scoring twelve goals in ten games.  He placed second in the league in points.   He returned to the Sockadillos for thirteen games in the 1991 summer season before moving to Germany to play for TuS Celle.  He remained with TuS Celle until 1994 when he returned to the United States to sign with the Austin Lone Stars of USISL.  He led the league in scoring with 30 goals in thirteen games.  In 1995, he began the season with the San Antonio Pumas before moving to the Charleston Battery for the second half of the season.  While he only scored six goals, he set the team record for single season assists with ten.  In 1997, he was back with the Austin Lone Stars, in 1998 and 1999, he played for the New Orleans Storm.  In 2001, he was a player-coach with the Lafayette Lightning and in 2003 with the Austin Lightning of the Premier Development League.  He also played for the Lafayette Swamp Cats in 2003.

References

1970 births
Living people
American soccer players
American expatriate soccer players
Austin Lightning players
Austin Lone Stars players
Charleston Battery players
FIU Panthers men's soccer players
Lafayette Swamp Cats players
New Orleans Riverboat Gamblers players
San Antonio Pumas players
TuS Celle FC players
USISL players
USL League Two players
Expatriate footballers in Germany
Association football forwards